Oribellidae is a family of mites belonging to the order Sarcoptiformes.

Genera:
 Infernobates Karppinen & Poltavskaja, 1990
 Kaszabobates Balogh, 1972
 Montizetes Kunst, 1971
 Oribella Berlese, 1908
 Oribellopsis Kunst, 1971
 Pantelozetes Grandjean, 1953
 Proteremaeus Piffl, 1965

References

Sarcoptiformes
Acari families